Baharak district is a district of Badakhshan province, Afghanistan located about 30 km southeast of Fayzabad. The capital is the city of Baharak. The district is also called Baharistan.

Sir Aurel Stein says that Bahārak was the capital of Badakhshan before the present capital of Fayzabad.

Footnotes

External links 
 Map at the Afghanistan Information Management Services

Districts of Badakhshan Province